Roberto Antonio Mejía Díaz (born April 14, 1972) is a Dominican former professional baseball second baseman. He played all or part of four seasons in Major League Baseball between 1993–1997, and one season in the Korea Baseball Organization in 2003. He most recently played for the El Paso Diablos of the American Association of Independent Professional Baseball in 2009.

Career
Signed by the Los Angeles Dodgers as an amateur free agent in 1988, Mejia made his major league debut with the Colorado Rockies on July 15, 1993, during their inaugural season. He appeared in his final major league game on April 11, 1997 with the St. Louis Cardinals. Since then, he has continued to play professionally, including several seasons in the Mexican League. In 2003, he played for the Hanwha Eagles of the KBO.

External links

1972 births
Albuquerque Dukes players
Colorado Rockies players
Colorado Springs Sky Sox players
Dominican Republic expatriate baseball players in Mexico
Dominican Republic expatriate baseball players in South Korea
Dominican Republic expatriate baseball players in the United States
El Paso Diablos players
Great Falls Dodgers players
Guerreros de Oaxaca players
Hanwha Eagles players
Indianapolis Indians players

Living people
Louisville Redbirds players
Macoto Cobras players
Major League Baseball players from the Dominican Republic
Major League Baseball second basemen
Memphis Redbirds players
Mexican League baseball left fielders
Mexican League baseball right fielders
Mexican League baseball second basemen
Mexican League baseball third basemen
Olmecas de Tabasco players
Pawtucket Red Sox players
People from Hato Mayor del Rey
Piratas de Campeche players
Rojos del Águila de Veracruz players
St. Louis Cardinals players
Taichung Agan players
Vero Beach Dodgers players